"A Rose Is a Rose" is a debut song recorded by American country music artist Meredith Edwards.  It was released in February 2001 as the first single from the album Reach.  The song reached #37 on the Billboard Hot Country Singles & Tracks chart.  The song was written by Deanna Bryant, Sunny Russ and Dave Berg.

Critical reception
A review in Billboard was positive, stating that "some young female acts seem as though they are going to great lengths to sound older and more sophisticated. They can get so busy trying to dazzle the listener with their pipes that they neglect to convey the emotion in the lyric. Not so with Edwards."

Chart performance

See also
 Rose is a rose is a rose is a rose

References

2001 debut singles
2001 songs
Meredith Edwards (singer) songs
Songs written by Dave Berg (songwriter)
Songs written by Deanna Bryant
Songs written by Sunny Russ
Song recordings produced by Keith Stegall
Mercury Records singles